AYX may refer to:

 Alteryx, a software company in California (NYSE: AYX)
 Arnold Air Force Base, a United States Air Force base in Tennessee